Teniente Coronel Carmelo Peralta Airport  is an airport serving the city of Concepción in Concepción Department, Paraguay.

The Concepcion non-directional beacon (ident: CON) is located on the field.

See also

 List of airports in Paraguay
 Transport in Paraguay

References

External links
 HERE Maps - Concepción
 OpenStreetMap - Concepción
 OurAirports - Concepción
 Concepción
 Skyvector Aeronautical Charts - Concepción

Airports in Paraguay